Elmhurst is a historic home located near Connersville, Fayette County, Indiana.  It was built in 1831, with later additions and modifications, and is a transitional Federal / Greek Revival style dwelling. Among its residents have been James N. Huston, Samuel W. Parker, Caleb Blood Smith, and Oliver H. Smith.

It was added to the National Register of Historic Places in 1977.

References

Houses on the National Register of Historic Places in Indiana
Federal architecture in Indiana
Greek Revival architecture in Indiana
Houses completed in 1831
Buildings and structures in Fayette County, Indiana
National Register of Historic Places in Fayette County, Indiana